Kidoor  is a village in Kasaragod district in the state of Kerala, India.

Demographics
As of 2011 Census, Kidoor village had total population of 2,569 which constitutes 1,300 males and 1,269 females. The sex ratio of Kidoor was 976 lower than state average of 1,084. In Kidoor, 9.4% of the population was under 6 years of age.
Kidoor village had an average literacy of 86.3% lower than state average of 94%. The male literacy stands at 90.6% and female literacy was 81.9%.

Transportation
Local roads have access to National Highway No.66 which connects to Mangalore in the north and Calicut in the south.  The nearest railway station is Manjeshwar on Mangalore-Palakkad line. There is an airport at Mangalore.

Languages
This locality is an essentially multi-lingual region. The people speak Malayalam, Kannada, Tulu, Beary bashe and Konkani And Urdu. Migrant workers also speak Hindi and Tamil languages.

Administration
This village is part of Manjeswaram assembly constituency which is again part of Kasaragod (Lok Sabha constituency)

Image Gallery

References

Manjeshwar area